Egleton is a small village and civil parish in the county of Rutland in the East Midlands of England.  It is situated south east of Oakham, and is close to the western shore of Rutland Water. The population of the village remained less than 100 at the 2011 census and was included with the parish of Burley.

St Edmund's Church, the Church of England parish church, is a Grade I listed building. It has a notable Norman tympanum.

The village's name means 'farm/settlement of Ecgwulf'.

Shallow lagoons of the reservoir come close to the village on the south and east and more are planned as a result of increased take of supplies from Rutland Water. An area of ancient meadows, rich in orchids, lies to the east. The Anglian Water Birdwatching Centre is here and the British Birdwatching Fair was held in the parish.

References

External links
Egleton Church Website

Villages in Rutland
Civil parishes in Rutland